Badger Township is a township in Vernon County, in the U.S. state of Missouri.

Badger Township was erected in 1873, taking its name from Albert Badger, a country doctor.

References

Townships in Missouri
Townships in Vernon County, Missouri